Abdikarim Egeh Gulaid is Minister for Finance in the Transitional Federal Government of Somalia, and former Minister of State for Public Works & Housing.

See also
List of members of the Somali Transitional Federal Parliament

References
https://web.archive.org/web/20081201193950/http://www.afdevinfo.com/htmlreports/peo/peo_10019.html
https://web.archive.org/web/20081121235916/http://www.somali-gov.info/newspages/ministerpublicworks.htm

Living people
Government ministers of Somalia
Members of the Transitional Federal Parliament
Year of birth missing (living people)
Place of birth missing (living people)